Lawrence D. "Mickey" McPhee (February 18, 1899 – November 27, 1983) was an American football player and coach.  He served as the head football coach at Oberlin College from 1922 to 1923 and at Ball State Teachers College—now known as Ball State University—from 1930 to 1934, compiling a career college football record of 25–27–2.

McPhee was born in New Castle, Pennsylvania on February 18, 1899.  He played football at Oberlin as a halfback and was named All-Ohio in 1921.  McPhee died on at the age of 84 on November 27, 1983, at the Austin Woods Nursing Home in Austintown, Ohio.

Head coaching record

References

1899 births
1983 deaths
American football halfbacks
Ball State Cardinals football coaches
Oberlin Yeomen football coaches
Oberlin Yeomen football players
College tennis coaches in the United States
High school football coaches in Ohio
New York University alumni
People from Lawrence County, Pennsylvania
Players of American football from Pennsylvania
Tennis coaches from Indiana